Hatun Q'asa (Quechua hatun big (jatun in Bolivia), q'asa mountain pass, "big mountain pass", Hispanicized spelling Jatunjasa) is a mountain in the Andes of Peru, about  high. It is situated in the Apurímac Region, Antabamba Province, Oropesa District. It lies south of Mallmanya, northwest of Sura Kallanka and southeast of Kimsaqucha. East of Hatun Q'asa there is a lake named Suraqucha (Soracocha).

References

Mountains of Peru
Mountains of Apurímac Region